Notelaea johnsonii, also known as the veinless mock olive, is a species of flowering plant in the olive family that is endemic to Australia.

Description
The species grows as a shrub or small tree up to about 8 m in height. The oval leaves are 40–120 mm long and 10–50 mm wide. The racemes of 5–11 small bluish-black flowers are 5–8 cm long. The bluish-black oval fruits are 18–20 mm long and 9–10 mm wide.

Distribution and habitat
The species occurs in south-eastern Queensland and north-eastern New South Wales, where it grows in lowland subtropical rainforest on basaltic soils.

References

 
johnsonii
Flora of New South Wales
Flora of Queensland
Lamiales of Australia
Taxa named by Peter Shaw Green
Plants described in 1968